Anina (German: Steierdorf; Hungarian: Stájerlakanina) is a town in the Banat region of Romania, in Caraș-Severin County, with a population of 10,886 in 2000. The town administers one village, Steierdorf (German: Steierdorf, Hungarian: Stájerlak).

Geology

In 2002, the oldest modern human remains in Europe were discovered in a cave near Anina. Nicknamed "Ion din Anina" (John of Anina), the remains (the lower jaw) are some 40,000 years old.

Anina represents one of the most important localities in the South Carpathians for Jurassic fossils, both plants and animals, as the geological heritage here is particularly diverse and well preserved (Popa, 2001, 2005). Anina is a fossil-Lagerstatte for Early Jurassic biota, the Hettangian-Sinemurian terrestrial Steierdorf Formation recording an extremely rich floral association, vertebrate and invertebrate tracks, traces and burrows. This paleontological heritage was uncovered also by significant mining works, such as underground mines and open cast mines, such works permitting the three-dimensional studies of the continental deposits, a unique opportunity in Europe and in the world, until the unfortunate closing of the last major mine in 2006. Still, the sterile dumps of the former mines and the former open cast mines of Ponor and Colonia Cehă very are rich in plant material, and they represent the subject of local conservation, as preserved sites or Sites of Special Scientific Interest (SSSI). 

The Early Jurassic (Hettangian - Sinemurian) flora is represented by Bryophytes (Hepaticae), Pteridophytes (Filicopsida, Sphenopsida, Lycopsida) and Gymnosperms (Pteridospermopsida, Ginkgopsida, Cycadopsida, Coniferopsida), with numerous coal generators (Givulescu, 1998, Popa and Van Konijnenburg - Van Cittert, 2005). Very rare vertebrate tunnels were recently described (Popa and Kedzior, 2006), such burrows being formerly reported only from three occurrences in the world (South Africa, Arizona and Argentina), tetrapod tracks such as Batrachopus cf. deweyi (Popa, 2000), and sauropod tracks of Parabrontopodus sp. type (Pienkowski et al., 2009).

The Middle Jurassic marine formations are also extremely rich in marine invertebrates and drifted floral remains, while the Upper Jurassic and Lower Cretaceous units display basinal and carbonate platform features (Bucur, 1997).

The coal mining industrial heritage is also significant, with Austrian industrial architecture and pits still preserved, such as the Northern Pit (Anina Pit I), Pit II, Pit IV (next to the Terezia Valley). Coal mining activities began in 1792, after the first coal outcrop was discovered by Matthew Hammer.

The Anina-Oravița railway built in 1863 is still in use today for touristic purposes. It is one of the most beautiful railways in Europe due to very picturesque landscapes, viaducts and long tunnels. The railway preserves many aspects of the original  design and, as such, it does not comply with many UIC standards and it needs special, more powerful locomotives and shorter rail coaches to operate.

Anina occurs between Cheile Nerei-Beușnița National Park and Semenic-Cheile Carașului National Park, and due to its natural and industrial heritage deserves the status of a geopark, a much needed status for such an important geological and historical area.

Climate
Anina has a humid continental climate (Cfb in the Köppen climate classification).

<div style="width:70%;">

Natives
 Ion Timofte

See also
 Peștera Muierilor
 Peștera cu Oase

Notes

References

 Bucur, I.I., 1997. Formatiunile mesozoice din zona Resita-Moldova Noua, Cluj-Napoca, 214 pp.
 Givulescu, R., 1998. Flora fosila a Jurasicului inferior de la Anina. Editura Academiei Romane, Bucuresti, 90 pp.
 Pienkowski, G., Popa, M.E. and Kedzior, A., 2009. Early Jurassic sauropod footprints of the Southern Carpathians, Romania: palaeobiological and palaeogeographical significance. Geological Quarterly, 53(4): 461–470.
 Popa, M.E., 2000. First find of Mesozoic tetrapod tracks in Romania. Acta Palaeontologica Romaniae, 2: 387–390.
 Popa, M.E., 2001. Ponor SSSI (Site of Special Scientific Interest). Lower Jurassic Paleoflora. In: I.I. Bucur, Filipescu, S., Sasaran, E. (Editor), Algae and carbonate platforms in western part of Romania. Field trip guidebook. Babes-Bolyai University, Cluj-Napoca, pp. 167–171.
 Popa, M.E., 2005. Aspects of Romanian Early Jurassic Palaeobotany and Palynology. Part VI. Anina, an exceptional locality. Acta Palaeontologica Romaniae, 5: 375–378.
 Popa, M.E. and Kedzior, A., 2006. Preliminary ichnological results on the Steierdorf Formation in Anina, Romania. In: Z. Csiki (Editor), Mesozoic and Cenozoic vertebrates and paleoenvironments, Bucuresti, pp. 197–201.
 Popa, M.E. and Van Konijnenburg - Van Cittert, J.H.A., 2006. Aspects of Romanian Early - Middle Jurassic palaeobotany and palynology. Part VII. Successions and floras. Progress in Natural Sciences, 16: 203–212.

Populated places in Caraș-Severin County
Localities in Romanian Banat
Towns in Romania
Mining communities in Romania
Monotowns in Romania